The Duchesnean North American Stage on the geologic timescale is a North American Land Mammal Age (NALMA), with an age from 42 to 38 million years BP, representing . It falls within the Eocene epoch. The Duchesnean is preceded by the Uintan and followed by the Chadronian NALMA.

The Duchesnean falls within the Bartonian age of the geologic timescale.

References

 
Eocene life
Eocene animals of North America